Statistics of Swedish football Division 5 for the 2011 season. This is Part 2 which covers Stockholm, Södermanland, Uppland, Värmland, Västerbotten, Västergötland, Västmanland, Ångermanland, Örebro Läns and Östergötland.

See also 2011 Division 5 (Part 1) which covers Blekinge, Bohuslän, Dalarna, Dalsland, Gestrikland, Gotland, Göteborg, Halland, Hälsingland, Jämtland-Härjedalen, Medelpad, Norrbotten, Skåne and Småland.

League standings

Stockholm Mellersta 2011

Stockholm Norra 2011

Stockholm Södra 2011

Södermanland Gul 2011

Irakona International SC      Withdrew

Södermanland Svart 2011

Uppland Västra 2011

Uppland Östra 2011

Värmland Västra 2011

Värmland Östra 2011

Västerbotten Norra 2011

Västerbotten Södra 2011

Västergötland Nordvästra 2011

Västergötland Norra 2011

Västergötland Sydvästra 2011

Västergötland Sydöstra 2011

Västergötland Västra 2011

Västergötland Östra 2011

Västmanland 2011

Ångermanland 2011

Örebro Norra 2011

Axbergs IF                    Withdrew

Örebro Södra 2011

Östergötland Mellersta 2011

Östergötland Västra 2011

Östergötland Östra 2011

See also 
 2011 Swedish football Division 5 (Part 1)

Footnotes

References 

Swedish Football Division 5 seasons
7